Gavin Jarvie (20 January 1879 – 25 July 1957) was a Scottish footballer who played as a defender for clubs including Bristol Rovers and Sunderland.

Career
Jarvie was born in Newton, Scotland. He made his debut for Sunderland on 2 September 1907 against Manchester City in a 5–2 defeat at Roker Park. He played for Sunderland from 1907 to 1911, making 95 league appearances while scoring two goals.

References
Bibliography
Gavin Jarvie's careers stats at The Stat Cat

Notes

1879 births
1957 deaths
Scottish footballers
Association football defenders
English Football League players
Southern Football League players
Scottish Football League players
Scottish Junior Football Association players
Cambuslang Rangers F.C. players
Airdrieonians F.C. (1878) players
Bristol Rovers F.C. players
Sunderland A.F.C. players
Hamilton Academical F.C. players
Sportspeople from Cambuslang
Footballers from South Lanarkshire